Helen Humphreys (born March 29, 1961) is a Canadian poet and novelist.

Personal life 
Humphreys was born in Kingston-on-Thames, England. Her brother Martin and sister Cathy were born after the family moved to Canada. She now lives in Kingston, Ontario with her dog, Fig.  When she was younger she was expelled from high school and had to attend an alternative school to finish her education.

Writing career 
Humphreys's first novel, Leaving Earth, was a New York Times Notable Book in 1998, and a winner of the City of Toronto Book Award.

In describing how she became a writer, Humphreys said, "I started writing when I was young and I just kept going. I read voraciously. I sent my poems (for I was writing exclusively poems then) out to magazines, and eventually I began to get them published. My first book of poetry came out when I was 25."

In a very favourable review of The Reinvention of Love in The Globe and Mail, Donna Bailey Nurse wrote:  "The story is set amid the political turbulence and artistic fervour of 19th-century Paris. Charles Sainte-Beuve, an influential critic, earns the friendship of Victor Hugo after writing a review celebrating the writer's poems. He joins Hugo's literary circle, the Cenacle, which includes painter Delacroix, poet Lamartine and the boastful, profligate Alexandre Dumas. Charles becomes a fixture in the bustling Hugo household on Notre-Dame-des-Champs."

The Globe and Mail had this to say about Ms. Humphreys's recent novel:  "The Evening Chorus, when all is said and done, is a formally conventional but for the most part satisfying yarn; a quiet novel about a calamitous event whose most trenchant passages show the cast of Humphreys's poet's eye."

Quill & Quire says of The River (2017):  "Comparing The River to Helen Humphreys's critically acclaimed bestseller The Frozen Thames, her 2007 collection of vignettes about the eponymous river, it's obvious that the author is not content to repeat past successes. The new book, a wide-ranging exploration of the Napanee River in Ontario, along which she owns a small property, clearly shows that Humphreys possesses extraordinary tools and wields them with daring and precision."

Works

Poetry
 Gods and Other Mortals (1986)
 Nuns Looking Anxious (1990)
 Listening to Radios (1990)
 The Perils of Geography (1995)
 Anthem (1999)

Novels
 Ethel on Fire (1991)
 Leaving Earth (1998) -  winner of the City of Toronto Book Award
 Afterimage (2000) - winner of the Rogers Writers' Trust Fiction Prize
 The Lost Garden (2002)
 Wild Dogs (2004) - adapted for the stage by Anne Hardcastle in 2008
 The Frozen Thames (2007)
 Coventry (2008)
 The Reinvention of Love (2011)
 The Evening Chorus  (2015)
 Machine Without Horses  (2018)
 Rabbit Foot Bill (2020)

Nonfiction 
Nocturne: On the Life and Death of My Brother (2013)
 The River (2015) 
 The Ghost Orchard: The Hidden History of the Apple in North America (2017) 
Field Study: Meditations on a Year at the Herbarium (2021) 
And a Dog Called Fig: Solitude, Connection, the Writing Life (2022)

Awards
 Canadian Authors Association Award for Poetry for Anthem (1990)
 New York Times Notable Book (1998) for Leaving Earth
 City of Toronto Book Award for Leaving Earth
 Rogers Writers' Trust Fiction Prize (2000) for Afterimage
 Harbourfront Festival Prize (2009)
 The Reinvention of Love (2011) was longlisted for the Dublin IMPAC Literary Award and shortlisted for the Canadian Authors Association for Fiction
Appointed to a four-year term as Poet Laureate of Kingston, Ontario, March 2015
The Evening Chorus  was longlisted for the 2017 International Dublin Literary Award.

References

External links
 Helen Humphreys fonds at Queen's University Archives
 https://www.nytimes.com/2009/03/15/books/review/Haslett-t.html?_r=0
 https://www.theguardian.com/books/2009/sep/12/coventry-helen-humphreys
 The Independent
 http://news.nationalpost.com/2011/09/09/open-book-the-reinvention-of-love-by-helen-humphreys/
 https://www.theglobeandmail.com/arts/books-and-media/book-reviews/helen-humphreyss-the-evening-chorus-is-a-formally-conventional-but-satisfying-yarn/article23116941/
 https://www.theglobeandmail.com/arts/books-and-media/the-reinvention-of-love-by-helen-humphreys/article557355/

1961 births
Living people
Canadian women novelists
Canadian women poets
English emigrants to Canada
Harbourfront Festival Prize winners
Writers from Kingston, Ontario
20th-century Canadian poets
20th-century Canadian novelists
21st-century Canadian novelists
Canadian lesbian writers
Canadian LGBT poets
Canadian LGBT novelists
20th-century Canadian women writers
21st-century Canadian women writers
Poets Laureate of places in Canada
Lesbian novelists
21st-century Canadian LGBT people
20th-century Canadian LGBT people